Nitocris ordinarily refers to a supposed queen of the Egyptian 6th Dynasty, see Nitocris.

The name may also denote:
 Nitocris I (Divine Adoratrice), a God's Wife of Amun during the 26th Dynasty
 Nitocris II, a female High Priest of Amun
 Nitocris of Babylon, an otherwise unknown queen regnant of Babylon described by Herodotus
 Nitocris (band), a band, and their self-titled album Nitocris
 Nitocris, a synonym of the moth genus Proteuxoa in the family Noctuidae